Eric Scott Judy is an American musician best known as the original bass guitarist, co-founder, and occasional backing vocalist of  the indie rock band Modest Mouse. He departed the group in roughly 2011 or early 2012.

Other work 
Judy appeared on Adam Forkner's first solo album in 2003. He also is a member of Isaac Brock's side project Ugly Casanova. As of 2016 Judy played in the Seattle-based Rudy Waltz.  As of 2021, he owns a bookstore in Seattle with his wife Desirae Wilkerson.

References 

Living people
American bass guitarists
Musicians from Seattle
Guitarists from Washington (state)
American male bass guitarists
Modest Mouse members
Ugly Casanova members
21st-century American male musicians
Year of birth missing (living people)